Mundota Fort and Palace are approximately 450-year-old heritage monuments and structures located in Mundota,  a small town in the hills of the Aravali Range in the state of Rajasthan in north-western India. Mundota was a Double Tazmi Jagir of the Nathawat clan of the Kachwaha dynasty, the rulers of  Jaipur.

The palace was built around 1550 by Jaswant Singh, a contemporary of the Mughal emperor Akbar. The fort predates the palace by at least a century.

References

Palaces in Rajasthan
Tourist attractions in Jaipur district
Buildings and structures in Jaipur district